Oakes Tonne Fegley (born November 11, 2004) is an American actor. He has starred in  Pete's Dragon (2016), Wonderstruck (2017), The Goldfinch (2019), The War with Grandpa (2020), and The Fabelmans (2022).

Early life and education
Fegley was born November 11, 2004 in Allentown, Pennsylvania, the son of Michael Fegley and Mercedes (née Tonne). He is the older brother of Winslow Fegley, also an actor.

Career
In 2014, Fegley made his acting debut with the drama film Fort Bliss, playing Paul Swann along with Michelle Monaghan and Ron Livingston. The film, which premiered in 2014, was directed by Claudia Myers. He played the young Judd Altman in the comedy-drama film This Is Where I Leave You, directed by Shawn Levy and released in September 2014 by Warner Bros. Pictures. He later appeared as Young Elias "Eli" Thompson in the fifth season of the HBO series Boardwalk Empire. He also has appeared in CBS' Person of Interest as Gabriel Hayward.

Fegley played the lead role of Pete in Walt Disney Pictures' fantasy comedy-drama film Pete's Dragon, opposite Oona Laurence, Bryce Dallas Howard, and Robert Redford. The film was directed by David Lowery and released in August 2016.

Fegley appeared in The Weinstein Company's comedy film The War with Grandpa starring Robert De Niro, released in August 2020.

Filmography

Film

Television

Nomination and awards

References

External links 

 
 

Living people
2004 births
21st-century American male actors
American male child actors
American male film actors
American male television actors
Male actors from Allentown, Pennsylvania